The tallest Statue of Parashurama is located at Mango meadows Agricultural Theme Park, Kaduthuruthy, Kerala, India.

About the statue
The height of the statue is about 30 feet. Parashurama is the sixth avatar of Vishnu in Hinduism. He is one of the chiranjeevis (immortal) of Hinduism and is believed to have lived during the Treta Yuga and Dvapara Yuga. He is also known as the father of Kalarippayattu.

References

Buildings and structures in Kottayam district
Colossal statues in India
Year of establishment missing